Grotto-heavens are a type of sacred Taoist site. Grotto-heavens are usually caves, grottoes, mountain hollows, or other underground spaces. Because every community was supposed to have access to at least one grotto, there were many of them all over China. They were first organized systematically in the Tang Dynasty by Sima Chengzhen  (647–735, see Zuowanglun) and Du Guangting  (850-933). The most sacred of these sites were divided into two types: The ten greater grotto-heavens and the thirty-six lesser grotto-heavens.

Locations of the ten greater grotto-heavens are as follows:

 Mt. Wangwu grotto  (Henan)
 Mt. Weiyu grotto  (Zhejiang)
 Mt. Xicheng grotto  (Shanxi)
 Mt. Xixuan grotto  (Sichuan)
 Mt. Qingcheng grotto  (part of Huashan, Shanxi)
 Mt. Chicheng grotto  (Guangdong)
 Mt. Luofu grotto  (Guangdong)
 Mt. Gouqu grotto  (Jiangsu, in Lake Tai)
 Mt. Linwu grotto  (on Maoshan, Jiangsu)
 Mt. Kuocang grotto  (Zhejiang)

References

Sources
 Kohn, Livia, ed. Daoism Handbook (Leiden: Brill, 2000).

See also
Buddhist grottoes (China)
Longmen Grottoes
Mogao Caves
Yungang Grottoes
Sacred Mountains of China
 Xianren Cave

Grottoes
Sacred caves
Caves of China
Taoism in China
Taoist cosmology
Taoist temples in China
Religious buildings and structures in China